Egba Kotan II is the king of the Yoruba State of Dassa in central Benin. The king rose to the throne on March 3, 2002.

See also
List of rulers of the Yoruba state of Dassa
List of current constituent African monarchs

References

21st-century Beninese people
Obas of Benin
Beninese Ahmadis
Living people
Year of birth missing (living people)
Place of birth missing (living people)